Sándor Czomba (born 14 August 1963) is a Hungarian engineer and politician, member of the National Assembly (MP) for Vásárosnamény (Szabolcs-Szatmár-Bereg County Constituency VIII) between 2006 and 2014, and the Fidesz's national list from 2014 to 2018. He was a member of the Committee on Employment and Work from 30 May 2006 to 13 May 2010.

After the legislative election in 2010, he was appointed Secretary of State for Employment in the Ministry of National Economy on 2 June 2010. He was replaced by Péter Cseresnyés on 8 October 2015. Following that, he served as a vice-chairman of the Economic Committee until the end of the parliamentary term in May 2018.

Personal life
He is married with his second wife, Dóra Baranyai. His first wife was Tünde Nagy. He has three children.

References

1963 births
Living people
Fidesz politicians
Members of the National Assembly of Hungary (2006–2010)
Members of the National Assembly of Hungary (2010–2014)
Members of the National Assembly of Hungary (2014–2018)
People from Vásárosnamény